Black and tan may refer to:

 Black and Tan, a drink made by mixing dark and light beers, typically Guinness and Bass ale
 Black and Tans, a British paramilitary force, (formed to suppress the Irish War of Independence), who wore khaki and dark shirts.
 Black and Tan War, alternative name for the Irish War of Independence
Come Out, Ye Black and Tans, an Irish rebel song referring to the Black and Tans
 Black-and-tan faction, a defunct biracial faction of the U.S. Republican Party
 Black and tan clubs, a type of club in the United States in the early 20th century catering to black and mixed-race persons
 Black and tan, coat (dog) coloration, sometimes used to specify a breed: 
 Austrian Black and Tan Hound
 Black and Tan Coonhound
 Black and Tan Terrier
 English Toy Terrier (Black & Tan)
 Scarteen Hunt, a hunt pack of Kerry Beagles in Scarteen, County Limerick, Ireland
 Black and Tan (film), 1929 short film featuring Duke Ellington and his Cotton Club Orchestra
 "Black and Tan Fantasy", song featured in the film
 "Black and Tan: A Crime of Fashion", season 2 episode of Psych
 Black & Tan, fictional movie in "Film Fest: Tears of a Clone" episode of Clone High